The National Cyber Security Centre of Lithuania is a government internet security organization in Vilnius, Lithuania. The Centre is part of the Ministry of National Defence. It analyses the cyber security environment in Lithuania, protects national databases, manages internet operations of national organizations, prepares cyber security plans and investigates internet attacks. 

The National Cyber Security Centre of Lithuania was established due to increasing internet attacks against Lithuanian government organizations. Every year there are around 25,000 attacks and the number increases by 10-20% every year. The Centre was created in 2015 by reforming the Communications and Information Systems Service of Lithuania. The centre issues recommendations regarding safe usage of the internet and mobile apps.

In 2018, it warned and did not recommend to use Yandex. Taxi app due to its superfluous permission requirements and access to sensitive data and data storing on servers in Russia.

See also 
 National Cyber Security Centre (disambiguation) in other countries

Links

References 

Internet in Lithuania
Organizations based in Vilnius
Business organizations based in Lithuania
Communications and media organizations based in Europe
Communications in Lithuania
Mass media in Lithuania
Law enforcement agencies of Lithuania
2015 establishments in Lithuania
Lithuania